Margaret Clark is an American politician from California. Clark is a member of the city council and a former mayor of Rosemead, California.

Education 
Clark attended University of Bordeaux in Europe through the University of California's Education Abroad Program. Clarke earned a Bachelor's degree and a teaching credential from UCLA.

Career 
Clark served as a Planning Commissioner.

With the death of councilman Robert DeCocker in October 1990, a special election was held in Rosemead, California. In March 1991, Clark won the election and became a member of the city council for Rosemead, California, serving the remaining term until April 1992. Clark defeated Joe Vasquez and Jean DeCocker. Joe Vasquez lost by 26 votes.

Having previously served six terms, Clark now serves on the Rosemead city council.
When she was re-elected mayor in 2009, she stated: "I'll look at each project that comes before us individually," she said. "The council sets policy... We hire people to implement our visions. I will hire people that have vision, that have the expertise and we will look at what they are recommending, but I am not a micromanager."  "My vision is to keep Rosemead a bedroom community, with places to shop and eat and enjoy."

Controversy
In March 2005, Rosemead's city council election became quite contentious due to citywide anti-Wal-Mart sentiment.  Clark, who supported the addition of a Wal-Mart to the city, came in third in the election behind challengers John Tran and John Nunez.

While serving on Rosemead's city council in May 2008, Clark supported the censure of a city councilman who was accused of sexually harassing a former city employee. The suit brought by the former employee was settled out of court for $330,000 - to be paid by the City of Rosemead's liability insurance. Clark, who opposed any settlement that would find the City of Rosemead liable, criticized the statement saying, "I think it's just outrageous what he did, and that there are no consequences for him." Although the councilman had written a letter of apology to all city employees except city council members, Clark stated that "he should do the honorable thing and resign."  She also stated "This letter does not apologize for anything" and said she believed that the letter was a "ploy" in preparation for the 2009 election. In the 2009 election, the accused councilman was defeated, losing his council seat.

In 2020, when the County proposed temporarily turning a Motel 6 in Rosemead into temporary housing for the homeless, Margaret Clark sent out an email asking residents to oppose the program because that child sexual predators would benefit from the program. Such comments have received harsh criticism from housing and homelessness advocates alike.

Personal life 
Clark is the great-granddaughter of former United States President Rutherford B. Hayes.

Clark's husband is Jim Clark. Clark and her family lives in Rosemead, California. Clark has been a resident of Rosemead for more than 40 years.

See also
 Bronislaw Malinowski Award

References

External links
Official Rosemead website profile
 Rivers and Mountains Conservancy board members

Mayors of places in California
Women mayors of places in California
Living people
People from Rosemead, California
University of California, Los Angeles alumni
University of Bordeaux alumni
Year of birth missing (living people)
21st-century American women